The 1976–77 season was Cardiff City F.C.'s 50th season in the Football League. They competed in the 22-team Division Two, then the second tier of English football, finishing eighteenth.

The season also saw the arrival of Robin Friday who, although it would be his only full season at the club, made such an impression that he was voted as the club's all-time cult hero.

Players

Source.

League standings

Results by round

Fixtures and results

Second Division

Source

League Cup

FA Cup

European Cup Winners Cup

Welsh Cup

See also
Cardiff City F.C. seasons

References

Bibliography

Welsh Football Data Archive

Cardiff City F.C. seasons
Association football clubs 1976–77 season
Card